The Old Cadet Chapel at the United States Military Academy is a church and location of funeral and memorial services. It is the oldest chapel at West Point, having originally been built in 1836. The chapel was originally located in the cadet area near present-day Bartlett Hall, but was disassembled brick-by-brick and moved to the West Point Cemetery when the current Cadet Chapel opened in 1910. Lutheran services are held at the old chapel on Sunday mornings during the school year.

There are marble plaques on the walls commemorating the generals of the American Revolution.  Benedict Arnold's plaque contains only the inscription "Major General — Born 1740", his name omitted due to his treason.

References

External links

United States Military Academy
Military chapels of the United States
University and college chapels in the United States
Relocated buildings and structures in New York (state)
Churches completed in 1836
19th-century churches in the United States
Religious buildings and structures in New York (state)
1836 establishments in New York (state)